Somebody Feed Phil is an American television travel documentary series presented by Philip Rosenthal that premiered on Netflix on January 12, 2018.

In May 2019, Netflix announced that it had renewed Somebody Feed Phil for a third season, which was released on May 29, 2020. A fourth season, shot back-to-back with the third, was released on October 30, 2020. The fifth season was released on May 25, 2022. The show was also renewed for a sixth season, which was filmed back-to-back with season 5. In January 2023, the show was renewed for a seventh season.

Overview

Each episode follows Rosenthal touring the cuisine of the episode's featured city, and spotlights charities and non-profit organizations that operate in the region. The show is a spiritual successor to Rosenthal's previous show on PBS, I'll Have What Phil's Having. When Rosenthal moved the program from PBS to Netflix, a theme song recorded by the band Lake Street Dive was added to the opening. Phil's brother Rich Rosenthal serves as executive producer and showrunner of the series, and sometimes appears on camera to sample food at Phil's urging.

Near the end of each episode during the first two seasons, Rosenthal makes a video call to his parents, Max and Helen, relating to them his culinary discoveries. After Helen's death in 2019, Max continued to appear in the segment for the next two seasons until his death in 2021. In the fifth season, Rosenthal would call a different guest each episode, which included his son Ben, Everybody Loves Raymond stars Ray Romano and Brad Garrett, Gilbert Gottfried, Judy Gold, and Paul Reiser, to continue the tradition. Viewers have enjoyed the segment.

A companion cookbook to the series, Somebody Feed Phil: The Book, was released in October 2022.

Episodes

Season 1 (2018)

Season 2 (2018)

Season 3 (2020)

Season 4 (2020)

Season 5 (2022)

Season 6 (2022)

References

External links
 
 

2010s American documentary television series
2018 American television series debuts
2020s American documentary television series
English-language Netflix original programming
Food travelogue television series
Netflix original documentary television series